Meyer's blind legless skink or the variable blind legless skink (Typhlosaurus meyeri) is a species of lizard in the family Scincidae. The species is found in Namibia and South Africa.

Etymology
The specific names  meyeri, is in honor of German ornithologist Adolf Bernhard Meyer.

References

Typhlosaurus
Skinks of Africa
Reptiles of Namibia
Reptiles of South Africa
Reptiles described in 1894
Taxa named by Oskar Boettger